Milton David Álvarez (born 26 January 1989) is an Argentine professional footballer who plays as a goalkeeper for Quilmes.

Career
Álvarez began his career in 2008 with Colegiales, being moved into the senior squad during the 2008–09 Primera B Metropolitana season. He departed in 2010 without making an appearance for Colegiales, subsequently signing for Huracán of Torneo Argentino A. He appeared fifteen times in 2011–12, a campaign which ended with relegation in Torneo Argentino B. Álvarez remained with Huracán for one further season, prior to leaving for Sportivo Italiano in 2013. After six months with the club, Álvarez was on the move again in January 2015 when he rejoined Colegiales. His first match back was a 1–1 draw with Deportivo Merlo on 6 April.

He was selected in thirty-three fixtures in the 2015 Primera B Metropolitana. Fellow third tier outfit Deportivo Morón signed Álvarez on 3 January 2016. His stay with the club lasted between 2016 and 2018, which included seventy-six appearances and a promotion to Primera B Nacional in 2016–17. In July 2018, Álvarez joined Independiente of the Argentine Primera División.

Career statistics
.

Honours
Sportivo Italiano
Primera C Metropolitana: 2013–14

Deportivo Morón
Primera B Metropolitana: 2016–17

Independiente
Suruga Bank Championship: 2018

References

External links

1989 births
Living people
People from Vicente López Partido
Argentine footballers
Association football goalkeepers
Torneo Argentino A players
Torneo Argentino B players
Primera C Metropolitana players
Primera B Metropolitana players
Primera Nacional players
Club Atlético Colegiales (Argentina) players
Huracán de Tres Arroyos footballers
Sportivo Italiano footballers
Deportivo Morón footballers
Club Atlético Independiente footballers
Sportspeople from Buenos Aires Province